Aleksandra Filipovska  is a Senior Research Fellow at the University of Western Australia (School of Chemistry and Biochemistry), heading a research group at the Harry Perkins Institute of Medical Research. Specializing in biochemistry and molecular biology, she has made contributions to the understanding of human mitochondrial genetics in health and disease.

Education and training
After graduating with a Bachelor of Science (with Honors) in 1998, Filipovska received her Ph.D. at the University of Otago, New Zealand in 2002. Between 2003-2005 she completed postdoctoral training as a New Zealand Foundation for Research, Science and Technology Fellow at the MRC Mitochondrial Biology Unit in Cambridge, the United Kingdom, before relocating to Australia in 2006 as a National Health and Medical Research Council of Australia (NHMRC) Howard Florey Fellow. From 2009-2014 she was an Australian Research Council (ARC) Future Fellow. She has been supported by an NHMRC Senior Research Fellowship as well as project grants from the NHMRC and ARC.

Research focus
Filipovska's research focuses on mitochondria, the 'powerhouses' that provide all human cells with energy. Dysfunction of mitochondria contributes to a variety of debilitating human diseases including neurodegenerative disorders, diabetes and cancer. During her graduate studies, Filipovska investigated how mutations in genes encoding for mitochondrial proteins can lead to disease, and developed new approaches to manipulate mitochondrial DNA replication and expression as potential therapies. During her postdoctoral work, she explored the use of compounds targeting mitochondria as a means to reduce oxidative stress in cells during aging and disease. Since establishing her research group at the Harry Perkins Institute of Medical Research, Filipovska has continued to focus on the molecular mechanisms by which changes in mitochondrial gene expression causes disease. Working with collaborators at the University of Western Australia, she recently identified a communication problem between a calcium channel in muscle cells and the protein dystrophin, which may underlie heart failure in muscular dystrophy patients.

Awards and prizes
Filipovska has been awarded the:
 2014 Merck Millipore Research Medal from the Australian Society of Biochemistry and Molecular Biology;
 2013 Ruth Stephens Gani Medal for research in human genetics from the Australian Academy of Science;
 2012 Young Investigator Award from the Australia and New Zealand Society for Cell and Developmental Biology;
 2011 WA Tall Poppy Award from the Australian Institute of Policy and Science, for excellence in science as well as involvement in science communication and outreach.
She was elected a Fellow of the Australian Academy of Health and Medical Sciences in 2022.

References

Living people
Year of birth missing (living people)
Fellows of the Australian Academy of Health and Medical Sciences
University of Otago alumni
Australian biochemists
Australian molecular biologists
Women biochemists
Australian women chemists
Women molecular biologists